Simon Robinson may refer to:

Simon W. Robinson (1792–1868), American Freemason
Simon Robinson (golfer) (born 1981), English professional golfer